is an Echizen Railway Katsuyama Eiheiji Line railway station located in the city of Fukui, Fukui Prefecture, Japan.

Lines

Station layout
The station consists of two elevated opposed side platforms with the station building located underneath. The station is unattended.

Adjacent stations

History
Shin-Fukui Station was opened on February 11, 1914. The line was extended between Fukuiguchi and Fukui on September 21, 1929. On September 1, 1942 the Keifuku Electric Railway merged with Mikuni Awara Electric Railway. The station was relocated to its present location on March 23, 1997. Operations were halted from June 25, 2001. The station reopened on July 20, 2003 as an Echizen Railway station. The station had a single island platform. On September 27, 2015 the station moved to temporary facilities, and reopened as an elevated station with two opposed side platforms on June 24, 2018.

Surrounding area
The station is in the middle of central Fukui on the east side of the JR Hokuriku Main Line tracks.
The Fukui regional government office complex is nearby; it has offices for national government agencies, including the Statistics Bureau and the MAFF Fukui office.
Other points of interest include:
Fukui Passport Office
Fukui Ōtemachi Post Office
Fukui City Hinode Elementary School
Yōkōkan Garden
Fukui City History Museum

See also
 List of railway stations in Japan

References

External links

  

Railway stations in Fukui Prefecture
Railway stations in Japan opened in 1914
Mikuni Awara Line
Katsuyama Eiheiji Line
Fukui (city)